Oral Fixation Tour is the third live album by Colombian singer and songwriter Shakira, released on 12 November 2007, by Epic Records. It was recorded during her concerts in Miami, Florida and San Juan, Puerto Rico as part of her Oral Fixation Tour (2006–07). The first disc is a DVD that features recordings of the performances from the tour. Disc 2 is a CD composed of 6 live recordings, the first being the concert's intro, from the concert.

Background
On this concert, Shakira had Alejandro Sanz as a guest and they performed together their 2005 smash hit "La Tortura". Wyclef Jean was also a guest and performed the 2006 worldwide hit "Hips Don't Lie" with Shakira. Shakira demonstrates her abilities as a musician playing the guitar during "Don't Bother" and "Inevitable", as well as the harmonica during "Te Dejo Madrid". The wardrobe Shakira wore on the concert was designed by Shakira and the prestigious designer Roberto Cavalli. The stage was designed by Shakira and Spanish visual artist Jaume de Laiguana. The Blu-ray edition was released 12 December 2007. The audio was recorded and mixed in stereo and 5.1 by Gustavo Celis. The live album quickly shot up the Mexican charts, peaking at number 1 for two non-consecutive weeks, and remained in the top 10 for over 11 weeks. Contrary to "Live & Off the Record", which was successful in Australia, certifying Gold, this release has not been promoted and did not chart there.

This DVD was marketed in a very unusual way. Instead of launching one or two singles to the radio or TV, they released almost all of the videos online to different top-visited websites, such as MySpace, People en Español, MTV, Yahoo, and MSN, with usually one or two videos on each website.

Track listing

 Spanish/Latin American/Walmart exclusive fan pack edition track listing.

Charts

This release has been very well received by critics. Various sources have commended Shakira's multi-instrumentalism. The release has charted highly in the United States and Europe, but has not charted in Australia.

References

External links
 Shakira's official website
 Oral Fixation Tour (DVD/CD) | SONY BMG Music Entertainment Store
 Shakira: Oral Fixation Tour (Blu-ray) : DVD Talk Review of the Blu-ray

Shakira live albums
2007 live albums
Live video albums
2007 video albums
Epic Records live albums
Epic Records video albums
Shakira video albums